The 1917 Ole Miss Rebels football team represented the University of Mississippi during the 1917 college football season. The season was the first under head coach Dudy Noble. The season closed with the team's only victory, over Mississippi College.

Schedule

References

Mississippi
Ole Miss Rebels football seasons
Ole Miss Rebels football